Syllabic may refer to:
Syllable, a unit of speech sound, considered the building block of words
Syllabic consonant, a consonant that forms the nucleus of a syllable
Syllabary, writing system using symbols for syllables
Abugida, writing system using symbols for consonant-vowel combinations (previously called syllabic and syllabic alphabet)
Canadian Aboriginal syllabics, a family of abugidas used to write a number of Aboriginal Canadian languages
Syllabic octal, octal representation of 8-bit syllables or bytes
Syllabic verse, poetry that has a certain number of syllables per line
Syllabic text setting in music, in which each syllable is matched to a single note, as opposed to melismatic

See also
Syllable (disambiguation)
Semi-syllable (disambiguation)